Jozo Rados (born 5 August 1993) is an Austrian basketball player for Vienna and Austria.

Career
In 2010, Rados left his local team UKJ Mistelbach for the Swans Gmunden in the Austrian Basketball League.

In January 2013, Rados signed with Xion Dukes Klosterneuburg. He was named the Best Center of the Austrian League in the 2013–14 by Eurobasket.com.

In August 2017, Rados signed with Kapfenberg Bulls. In his first season with Kapfenberg, he won the double.

In the 2018 offseason, he signed with Traiskirchen Lions.

In the summer of 2019, Rados signed with his first foreign club when he signed with Union Neuchâtel in Switzerland.

In February 2020, Rados signed with Landstede Hammers in the Dutch Basketball League. On 25 July, Rados extended his contract with Hammers until 2021.

In June 2021, Rados returned to Austria when he signed with BC Vienna.

Honours
Swans Gmunden
2× Austrian Cup: 2010–11, 2011–12
Kapfenberg Bulls
Austrian Bundesliga: 2017–18
Austrian Cup: 2017–18

References

Traiskirchen Lions players
Landstede Hammers players
Dutch Basketball League players
Kapfenberg Bulls players
Swans Gmunden players
Klosterneuburg Dukes players
Union Neuchâtel Basket players
1993 births
Austrian men's basketball players
Living people
People from Mistelbach
Sportspeople from Lower Austria